Paleta is a Polish surname. Notable people with the surname include:

Dominika Paleta (born 1972), Polish-Mexican actress
Ludwika Paleta (born 1978), Polish-Mexican actress
Zbigniew Paleta (born 1942), Polish violinist and composer

Polish-language surnames